Nahda Club Barelias, or simply Nahda, is a football club based in Barelias,  Beqaa, Lebanon, that competes in the . The club was established in 1986 and competes in the Lebanese Second Division after gaining promotion from the Third Division in 2018.

History
Founded in 1986, the football club is based in the Bekaa area of Lebanon. It was formed in the Lebanese Second Division as the sole representative of clubs in the Bekaa before going down to the Third Division, in which they stayed during the 2004–05 season. However, the following season the club was promoted back to the Second Division.

Club rivalries 
Nahda plays the Barelias derby with Nasser, as they are both based in the same city.

Honours 
 Lebanese Third Division
 Champions (2): 2000–01, 2017–18

See also 
 List of football clubs in Lebanon

References

1986 establishments in Lebanon
Football clubs in Lebanon